There have been two baronetcies created for members of the Knightley family, one in the Baronetage of England and one in the Baronetage of Great Britain. Both creations are extinct.
The Knightley family originated at the Staffordshire manor of Knightley, acquired by them shortly after the Norman Conquest of 1066. In 1415 Sir Richard Knightley purchased the manor of Fawsley in Northamptonshire, where the senior line of the family became seated.

The Knightley Baronetcy, of Offchurch in the County of Warwick, was created in the Baronetage of England on 30 August 1660 for John Knightley, of a junior branch of the Knightley family seated at Offchurch Bury. The title became extinct on the death of the second Baronet in 1689.

The Knightley Baronetcy, of Fawsley in the County of Northampton, was created in the Baronetage of Great Britain on 2 February 1798 for John Knightley, with remainder to the male issue of his deceased younger brother Reverend Charles Knightley. He was succeeded according to the special remainder by his nephew, the second Baronet. He sat as Member of Parliament for Northamptonshire South. On his death the title passed to his son, the third Baronet. He also represented Northamptonshire South in the House of Commons. On 23 August 1892 he was raised to the Peerage of the United Kingdom as Baron Knightley, of Fawsley in the County of Northampton.

Lord Knightley was childless and on his death in 1895 the barony became extinct. He was succeeded in the baronetcy by his first cousin, the fourth Baronet. He was the son of Reverend Henry Knightley (1786–1813), younger brother of the second Baronet. He never married and was succeeded by his nephew, the fifth Baronet. He was the son of Reverend Henry Charles Knightley (1823–1884), younger brother of the fourth Baronet. Knightley was a member of the Northamptonshire County Council. He was childless and on his death the title passed to his younger brother, the sixth Baronet. He was a clergyman. He was also childless and on his death in 1938 the baronetcy became extinct.

Valentine Knightley (1718–1754), father of the first Baronet, was Member of Parliament for Northampton between 1748 and 1754.

The ancestral seat of the Knightley family was Fawsley in Northamptonshire. There is a monument to Sir Richard Knightley (d.1537) in St Michael's Church at Upton near Northampton.

Knightley baronets, of Offchurch (1660)
Sir John Knightley, 1st Baronet (c. 1611–c. 1670)
Sir John Knightley, 2nd Baronet (died 1689)

Knightley baronets, of Fawsley (1798)
Sir John Knightley, 1st Baronet (1747–1812)
Sir Charles Knightley, 2nd Baronet (1781–1864)
Sir Rainald Knightley, 3rd Baronet (1819–1895) (created Baron Knightley in 1892)

Barons Knightley (1892)
Rainald Knightley, 1st Baron Knightley (1819–1895)

Knightley baronets, of Fawsley (1798); reverted
Sir Valentine Knightley, 4th Baronet (1812–1898)
Sir Charles Valentine Knightley, 5th Baronet (1853–1932)
Sir Henry Francis Knightley, 6th Baronet (1854–1938)

References

Extinct baronetcies in the Baronetage of England
Extinct baronetcies in the Baronetage of Great Britain
Baronetcies created with special remainders